Spoladore is a surname. Notable people with the surname include: 

Lorena Salvatini Spoladore (born 1995), Brazilian Paralympic athlete
Simone Spoladore (born 1979), Brazilian actress